The Molloy Deep (also known as the Molloy Hole) is a bathymetric feature in the Fram Strait, within the Greenland Sea east of Greenland and about 160 km west of Svalbard. It is the location  of the deepest point in the Arctic Ocean. The Molloy Deep, Molloy Hole, Molloy Fracture Zone, and Molloy Ridge were named after Arthur E. Molloy, a U.S. Navy research scientist who worked in the North Atlantic, North Pacific and Arctic Oceans in the 1950s-1970s. 

The basin floor measures about 220 km2, and is the deepest point in the Arctic Ocean. The first and only person to have reached the bottom of the Molloy Deep is American explorer Victor Vescovo, as part of his Five Deeps Expedition.

Topography

The Molloy Deep is a roughly rectangular, seismically active, extensional, sea-floor basin, that lies between the northwestern tip of the Molloy Fracture Zone, (a right-lateral, strike-slip fault), and the Spitsbergen Fracture Zone (also a right-lateral, strike-slip fault). These two fracture zones connect the Knipovich Ridge (the actively spreading northern segment of the Mid-Atlantic Ocean ridge system), with the Lena Trough, an actively spreading mid-ocean ridge region north of the Spitsbergen Fracture Zone. The Lena Trough joins the southwestern end of the Arctic Ocean's Gakkel Ridge which is the slowest spreading mid-ocean ridge on Earth, and which stretches across the entire Arctic Oceans’ Eurasian Basin.

Surveys

The Molloy Deep was discovered in September 1972 by the USNS Hayes (T-AGOR-16), the first of a new class of catamaran-hulled oceanographic research vessels. The Molloy Deep, Molloy Hole, Molloy Fracture Zone, and Molloy Ridge were named after Arthur E. Molloy, a U.S. Navy research scientist who worked in the North Atlantic, North Pacific and Arctic Oceans in the 1950s-1970s.

Descents 
The first, and so far only, person to reach the bottom of the Molloy Deep is Victor Vescovo on 24 August 2019. The Five Deeps Expedition leader and chief submersible pilot, Vescovo, descended into the Molloy Deep in the Deep-Submergence Vehicle Limiting Factor (a Triton 36000/2 model submersible) from the support ship, the Deep Submersible Support Vessel DSSV Pressure Drop. The Five Deeps Expedition established the depth of the Molloy Deep as  ± by direct CTD pressure measurements. This is shallower than previous estimations using earlier technology with less precise bathymetric methods.

References

Lowest points of the World Ocean
Oceanic trenches of the Arctic Ocean
Oceanic basins of the Arctic Ocean
Geography of the Arctic